The FIBA Oceania Under-15 Championship is an under-15 basketball championship in the International Basketball Federation's Oceania zone.

Since 2018, the competition previously known as FIBA Oceania Under-16 Championship, which was a qualifier for the FIBA Under-17 Basketball World Cup, is now an under-15 competition for Oceania teams to qualify to the FIBA Asia Under-16 Championship (from which they can then qualify for the World Cup). The current champions are Australia.

Summary

Oceania Under-16 Championship

Under-15 Oceania Championship

Performances by nation

Participation details

References

 
Basketball competitions in Oceania between national teams
Oceania